Vasilisa Vasiliyevna Semenchuk (born 1966) is a Russian freestyle skier who competed for the Soviet Union. 

She competed at the FIS Freestyle World Ski Championships 1989 in Oberjoch, where she placed fifth in combined, tenth in aerials, and also took part in ski ballet and moguls. She won a gold medal in aerials at the FIS Freestyle World Ski Championships 1991.

References

External links 
 

1966 births
Living people
Russian female freestyle skiers
Soviet freestyle skiers
Sportspeople from Kalmykia